Rosaleen (Rosie) Moriarty-Simmonds  (born 1960) is a British businesswoman, artist and disability rights campaigner. She was born without arms or legs after her mother was prescribed thalidomide in pregnancy.

Education
She attended Ysgol Erw'r Delyn, a special school in Penarth, and from age 14 Treloar School in Alton, at that time the only school in the UK to offer an academic education for students with disabilities. She was the first disabled student to enrol at Cardiff University, graduating in 1985 with a BSc degree in psychology.

Career
After graduating Moriarty-Simmonds worked in the civil service at Companies House for seven years, at Executive Officer level.  In 1995 she established RMS Disability Issues Consultancy, which offers training in Disability Issues. She has appeared in many radio and television programmes, starting with an appearance in a television news bulletin at the age of two.

She was one of the leading campaigners for the creation of the Thalidomide Memorial in Cathays Park, Cardiff, to commemorate the survivors of thalidomide and those who fought for justice for them, and made a speech at its unveiling in 2016.

She has taken up painting and has been accepted as a student member of Mouth and Foot Painting Artists.

Publication
In 2007 she published her autobiography Four Fingers and Thirteen Toes (revised ed 2009 AuthorHouse UK).

Awards and honours
She was appointed O.B.E. in the 2015 New Year Honours "For Services to the Equality and Rights of Disabled People".

In 2017 Cardiff University awarded her an Honorary Fellowship, describing her as "a forthright and passionate speaker" who "has worked at the highest level ... to make significant changes in attitudes to disability".

Personal life
She married Stephen Simmonds, a solicitor, who is also Thalidomide impaired, in 1988. They have one son, born in 1995 after three earlier miscarriages. Her hobbies are photography and acting.

References

External links
 RMS Consultancy

1960 births
Living people
Alumni of Cardiff University
Officers of the Order of the British Empire
People with phocomelia
British businesspeople
British women in business
Artists with disabilities